The James Turner House, a one-story Greek Revival style building located on 406 North Washington Avenue in Marshall, Texas, was built by a merchant, George Gammon Gregg to be the home for him and his bride, Mary Ann Wilson, who were married in 1851. It was first located at the southeast corner of Crockett Street and Washington Avenue.

James Turner, an attorney and former Confederate soldier, acquired the house in 1866.  He had moved to Marshall from Sumner County, Tennessee in 1858. Turner and his wife had nine children and he built a separate structure as a "dormitory" for the expanding family. Turner became mayor of Marshall. In 1890, his son Robert added the Victorian columns and front porch, after he moved into the house with his new wife. Robert owned the house after the death of his father in 1913.

It was moved in the 20th century from Lot 1, facing Crockett Street, to Lot 2, now facing North Washington Avenue. At that time, the "dormitory" was razed and the salvaged wood was used for an addition of a new kitchen, a bathroom, and another room. The house had been unoccupied and fallen into disrepair several years after being used as an office building by the Harrison County Charities. The house was restored in 1977 by Robert's daughter and last surviving child, Eleanor Turner Gillespie, to essentially its original design; She removed the addition and replaced the roof and damaged plaster.

The house was made a Recorded Texas Historic Landmark and a historic marker was installed in 1979. It was also listed as a National Register of Historic Places that year.

See also

National Register of Historic Places listings in Harrison County, Texas
Recorded Texas Historic Landmarks in Harrison County

References

External links

Turner (James) House from the Center for Regional Heritage Research, Stephen F. Austin State University

National Register of Historic Places in Harrison County, Texas
Greek Revival architecture in Texas
Residential buildings completed in 1850
Harrison County, Texas
Recorded Texas Historic Landmarks